Reggie Tsiboe (born 7 September 1950) is a Ghanaian-British entertainer, dancer and one of the singers of the disco group Boney M. between 1982 and 1986 and later between 1989 and 1990.

In 1982, Tsiboe originally replaced the dancer Bobby Farrell, but in 1984 Farrell rejoined the group and they became a quintet. In 1986, the original band split after 10 successful years, but in 1989, Liz Mitchell and Reggie formed a new official version of Boney M. and in 1990 released with the help of the producer Frank Farian the single "Stories", but a few months later both went their separate ways.

Tsiboe appeared on the last three Boney M. albums: Ten Thousand Lightyears (1984), Kalimba de Luna - 16 Happy Songs (1984) and Eye Dance (1985) and also recorded Christmas songs with the group, which were internationally released only after the split of the band on the new Boney M. Christmas album, The 20 Greatest Christmas Songs in 1986. Reggie sang the main vocals on a number of Boney M. songs, including "Kalimba de Luna", "Happy Song", "Going Back West", "My Chérie Amour", "Young, Free and Single", "Bang Bang Lulu", "Dreadlock Holiday", "Barbarella Fortuneteller", "Mother and Child Reunion" and the Christmas songs "Joy to the World", "Oh Christmas Tree", "The First Noël" and "Auld Lang Syne".

On 21 September 2006, Tsiboe and the two other lead singers of Boney M., Liz Mitchell and Marcia Barrett, were special guests in London at the premiere of the musical Daddy Cool, which is based on the music of the famous group.

Before he joined the group he was a movie star in Ghana. One of the movies that gained him popularity was the film Love Brewed in an African Pot. Following his Boney M period Tsiboe returned to acting, He has also starred in a few UK TV productions including Doctor Who.

Tsiboe now resides in Marlborough, Wiltshire in England.

References

1950 births
Boney M. members
Living people
Ghanaian musicians
Ghanaian emigrants to England
People from Kumasi
Ghanaian male film actors
20th-century Ghanaian male actors